Managed Money is a 1934 short comedy film directed by Charles Lamont.  The film stars Frank Coghlan Jr. and Shirley Temple. It was also known as Frolics of Youth and Measured Money. This was the second film in which Temple starred as Mary Lou.  The film tells the story of Sonny and Sid prospecting for gold to pay for their military academy education. Sonny's sister, Mary Lou stows away in the back of their car. Eventually, they meet an inventor who helps them financially.

See also
 Shirley Temple filmography

References

External links

1934 films
1934 comedy films
American black-and-white films
Films directed by Charles Lamont
Educational Pictures short films
American comedy short films
1930s American films